Reykjavik Constituency may refer to:
 Reykjavík (Althing constituency), former Althing constituency
 Reykjavík North (Althing constituency), current Althing constituency
 Reykjavík South (Althing constituency), current Althing constituency